Feel Free may refer to:

 Feel Free (Laird book), a 2018 book of poems by Nick Laird
 Feel Free (Smith book), a 2018 book of essays by Zadie Smith
 Feel Free (album), a 1996 album by Welsh musician Mike Peters